Carissa Xenia Miller (born April 28, 1995) is an American professional soccer player who plays as a goalkeeper for National Women's Soccer League (NWSL) club Kansas City Current.

Club career

Chicago Red Stars
Miller made her NWSL debut in the 2020 NWSL Challenge Cup on July 1, 2020.

Kansas City Current
In February 2022, Miller was traded to Kansas City Current.

References

External links
 Florida State profile

1995 births
Living people
American women's soccer players
Soccer players from Arizona
People from Cave Creek, Arizona
Women's association football goalkeepers
Florida State Seminoles women's soccer players
PSV (women) players
Apollon Ladies F.C. players
Chicago Red Stars players
Eredivisie (women) players
American expatriate women's soccer players
Expatriate women's footballers in the Netherlands
American expatriate sportspeople in the Netherlands
Expatriate women's footballers in Cyprus
American expatriate sportspeople in Cyprus
National Women's Soccer League players
Sportspeople from the Phoenix metropolitan area
Kansas City Current players
Toronto Lady Lynx players